George Green Mathews Jr. (January 29, 1855 - March 1944) was an American diplomat and politician. He served as U.S. Consul at Pará, Brazil from 1893 to 1897, and on his return to the United States was a Florida State Representative and the 2nd mayor of Fort Lauderdale from 1913 to 1914.

Early life 

George G. Mathews was born on January 29, 1855, in Monroe County, Alabama, to Dr. George G. Mathews and Sarah Hybart. His father, a great-grandson of general George Mathews, removed his young family from Georgia to South America following the American Civil War when George Jr. was an adolescent and spent 23 years in Brazil before returning to the United States in 1881. Having spent most of his early life there, George Jr. was fluent in Portuguese and familiar with Brazilian customs.

United States consulate 
President Grover Cleveland appointed him United States consulate at Pará, Brazil, a position he held throughout President Cleveland's presidency of 1893-1897. Cleveland sought to forge new business relations with Brazil, and Mathews reported on business opportunities, specifically in paper manufacturing.

Later life 
On his return to the United States he settled in Fort Lauderdale, Florida, and translated his knowledge of the paper industry into private business success, publishing several local newspapers before founding the Fort Lauderdale "Sentinel" in 1910.
He played a prominent part in the political life of Fort Lauderdale, serving as a Florida State Representative for the city and serving on its City Council when that body was formed in 1912. He served as the 2nd mayor of Fort Lauderdale from 1913 to 1914. He died in Fort Lauderdale in 1944.

References 

1855 births
1944 deaths
People from Monroe County, Alabama
American diplomats
Editors of Florida newspapers
Florida city council members
Mayors of Fort Lauderdale, Florida
Members of the Florida House of Representatives